Philip or Phillip Wright may refer to:

Philip Green Wright (1861–1934), American economist
Phillip Wright (1889–1970), Australian pastoralist and philanthropist
Philip Quincy Wright (1890–1970), American political scientist
Philip Wright (actor), English actor
Philip Wright (cricketer) (1903–1968), English cricketer
Philip Adrian Wright (born 1956), English musician
Phillip Wright, American healthcare executive; CEO of Santa Rosa Medical Center (2009–14)
Philip S. Wright (born 1967), Belizean divine; bishop of Belize's Anglican Diocese
Philip Wright (field hockey) (born 1986) (Canada at the 2008 Summer Olympics)

See also
Wright (surname)